Raketfilm (the Rocket Film Festival) is a Swedish short films festival held annually in the city of Karlstad, since 2001, by Film i Värmland. It's a movie-making contest where independent filmmakers have to make a 3-minute short movie in just one weekend. The filmmakers get the rules on Film i Värmlands homepage on a Saturday and then they have one day of making a short movie. The Sunday that follows, the movies must be finished and they are shown to an audience and a jury for judging. There's 1st, 2nd, 3rd prize and an Audience Award.

Winners

2012
1st prize Käre Seppo
2nd prize Perrong C
3rd prize Slut
Audience Award Yolo

2010
1st prize Backdoor plumbing
2nd prize O va´
3rd prize Censur
Audience Award O va´

2009
1st prize En tôcken där - Bôttennapp
2nd prize Psykbryt
3rd prize En annan kärlekshistoria
Audience Award UFO-klubben
Honorary Award UFO-klubben
Honorary Award I öknen är pärlor inget värda
Honorary Award Shake off - the Revenge of Michael Flyers

2007
1st prize Jag har verkligen försökt, baby
2nd prize den nye
3rd prize Nej, inte skjuta Rufus
Audience Award Gårdstagen

2006
No festival this year

2005
1st prize En långvarig försäljning
2nd prize E211
3rd prize Baktankar
Audience Award En långvarig försäljning

2004
1st prize Magnus Mindville
2nd prize Smidigt Thord
3rd prize Förbannelsen
Audience Award Magnus Mindville

2003
1st prize Praktikanten
2nd prize Sharre
3rd prize EvOL
Audience Award Sharre

2002
1st prize Invigningen
2nd prize Beam me up, Scotty
3rd prize Punching Tiger, Singing Women
Audience Award Invigningen

2001
1st prize Ne me moleste mosquito

External links
Raketfilm's homepage
Raketfilm's Youtube channel

Swedish film awards
Film festivals in Sweden
Short film festivals
Karlstad